SM U-73 was one of 329 submarines serving in the Imperial German Navy in World War I. She engaged in the commerce war as part of the First Battle of the Atlantic.  U-73 has the distinction of being responsible for planting the underwater mine that later led to the sinking of the largest ship sunk during World War I, the 48,158 tons hospital ship Britannic.

Operations 
After completion at Danzig in November 1915, U-73 was commissioned by Kapitänleutnant Gustav Sieß. She joined the Kiel School, where she remained until February 1916, conducting trials and crew training. She then left for the North Sea and was attached to the 1st Half Flotilla. Her activities were monitored throughout the war by Room 40, and most of her recorded movements are based on that information. Her first operational cruise began 1 April 1916, when she left Heligoland Bight, bound for the Mediterranean by way of the North Sea. En route, she attacked one steamer in the Atlantic and laid mines off Lisbon and Malta. On 27 April 1916 she laid a minefield of 22 mines outside the Grand Harbour of Valletta in which four ships were sunk: the battleship ; the sloop ; HMT Crownsin, sunk 4 May 1916 with the loss of 11 men; and the yacht HMY Aegusa. On arriving in Cattaro on about 1 May (the date is uncertain), U-73 joined the Pola-Cattaro Flotilla.

The minelaying cruises of U-73 in the Mediterranean cannot be reconstructed. The battleship HMS Russell hit two of the mines and sank. On 7 October 1916 she is reported to have left Pola in Croatia, and the French put down to her the mine sunk off Cape Male on 12 October, as well as a minefield in the Gulf of Salonika, and mines in the Gulf of Athens on which two Greek ships were blown up. It seems certain U-73, still commanded by Sieß, laid the mine by which the hospital ship HMHS Britannic (currently the largest passenger ship resting on the seafloor and the largest ship sunk during World War I) was lost, only one hour after U-73 laid the mine. It is possible the hospital ship HMHS Braemar Castle was also damaged by one of her mines. U-73 suffered from constant machinery trouble in common with her class. At the end of October 1918, now in the hands of Kptlt. Fritz Saupe, she was scuttled at Pola in Croatia.

Summary of raiding history

References

Notes

Citations

Bibliography

World War I submarines of Germany
 
North Sea operations of World War I
Mediterranean naval operations of World War I
1915 ships
U-boats commissioned in 1916
Ships built in Kiel
U-boats scuttled in 1918
Maritime incidents in 1918
German Type UE I submarines